Lab Rats is a 2009 romantic comedy directed by Sam Washington. The film won the Starfish Award at the Moondance International Film Festival in 2011.

In 2013 Lab Rats was licensed by Frostbite Pictures for development from a short film into an episode-based internet web-series. The series won a Best Series award at LA Web Series Festival in 2014 and began distribution later that year.

Plot
To earn extra money, two university students, Zac and Cindy, get jobs as physiological test subjects. Neither knew that they would be used as pawns by the professors running the tests, who are using the two students to fight through a divorce.

Awards

References

External links
 
 

2009 films
2009 romantic comedy films
British comedy short films
2009 short films
Romantic comedy short films